Liguus vittatus is a species of air-breathing land snail, a terrestrial pulmonate gastropod mollusk in the family Orthalicidae.

References

Orthalicidae
Gastropods described in 1822